Martie Duncan is an American chef, blogger and party planner. She was a finalist on the eighth season of the Food Network series Food Network Star.

Career
Duncan has made several appearances on The Oprah Winfrey Show. She has had no formal culinary training, nor has she ever worked in a restaurant. Duncan is the president of her own party-planning company, M Content Media LLC.

Food Network Star
In 2012, Duncan became a contestant on the eighth season of the Food Network series Food Network Star, being mentored by Alton Brown. She eventually became one of the final four contestants, and she filmed a pilot for a potential series called Martie with the Party. Duncan was eliminated from Star Salvation in the second episode of the season.

Personal life
Duncan was born in Birmingham, Alabama. Her mother, Martha Bossart, died in 2004 at age 73. Duncan initially did not reveal her age, simply billing herself on Food Network Star as "slightly over 40"; however, she gave her age as 50 on the July 15, 2012 episode.

References

External links

1960s births
American bloggers
Chefs from Alabama
American women in business
Date of birth missing (living people)
Food Network Star contestants
Living people
Participants in American reality television series
Writers from Birmingham, Alabama
American women bloggers
American women chefs
21st-century American women